Route 118 is a numbered state highway in the U.S. state of Rhode Island, running  along Harkney Hill Road from Route 3 to Route 102 in Coventry. It is one of the more recent state highways, having been designated and signed c. 1999.

Route description
Route 118 begins at Route 102 (Victory Highway) in rural Coventry and heads east on a two-lane road through a heavily forested area. It curves to the north around the Quidnick Reservoir, then heads southeast into the Big River Management Area. Here, the road crosses Reynolds Pond, then bends to the northeast and crosses Maple Root Pond. Northeast of Maple Rood Pond, Route 118 meets its eastern terminus at a T-intersection with Route 3 (Nooseneck Hill Road).

Major intersections

References

External links

2019 Highway Map, Rhode Island

118
Transportation in Kent County, Rhode Island